the Mamluk campaigns against Cyprus were a series of military expeditions launched by the Mamluk Sultanate into the Kingdom of Cyprus between 1424 and 1426. As a result of the Mamluk victory in the battle of Khirokitia on 7 July 1426 and the capture of King Janus, Cyprus became a tributary state.

Background
In 1191, Richard I of England captured the island of Cyprus from the Byzantines during the Third Crusade, the island was later sold to Guy of Lusignan who purchased Cyprus from the Templars in 1192, who had themselves purchased it from Richard, Cyprus served as a supplier to the Levantine crusaders, in 1271, Baybars attempted to capture the island with an armada of 17 ships, but it was wrecked and destroyed in Limassol

Cyprus later became a base for Frankish pirates and raiders, in 1365, Peter I of Cyprus launched a raid into Alexandria and sacked the city for 3 days, killing its inhabitants and looting lots of treasures.

Raids continued later on, in August 1422, the Cypriots captured a ship in the port of Alexandria and in May 1424, they seized two ships from Damietta.

These raids prompted the Mamluk sultan Barsbay to send naval expeditions to Cyprus.

Campaigns

First campaign

In late September 1424, the Mamluk armada consisting of 4 or 5 landed near Limassol, the garrison knew about the incoming raid and evacuated the inhabitants before their arrival, leaving only 300 men and 70 knights led by the Bailli and reinforcements from Nicosia led by Philip Prevost, the Mamluks attacked Limassol, defeated its garrison, killed Philip Prevost, sacked the city and burning it, they also burned 3 ships and sank 3 others, the mamluks captured 23 men.

Second campaign

In July 1425, the mamluks launched an organized raid with an armada of 40 ships, the fleet arrived south of Famagusta where the governor pledged allegiance to the sultan and showed hospitality, the mamluks then raided the countryside, sacking everything in their way, then they marched to Larnaca, where they met the Cypriot fleet of 11 or 12 ships led by Janus's brother, defeating it, the mamluks again sacked Limassol, killed many of its inhabitants and departed in August, the number of slaves captured was around 1060 people and it took 70 camels to collect the looted treasures.

Third campaign

The mamluks aimed to subjugate the entire island, preparing a fleet of 100 ships, the mamluks fleet for the third time attacked Limassol on July 1, destroying the castle. The mamluks spent 6 days ravaging everything in their way until they met Janus's army in the fields of Khirokitia on July 7, the Cypriot army was routed and king Janus was captured in battle, They marched to capture Nicosia, however learning the news of naval reinforcement of 14 ships, the mamluk marched to meet them and in the ensuing battle, they killed 1500 crusaders and then went on to capture Nicosia, sacking a side of the city, on July 18, the mamluks embarked for home.

Aftermath

When news reached Cairo, it was greatly celebrated in the city, and festivals were made, the people welcomed the mamluks from their victorious campaign, the looted treasure, and the prisoners, around 1000, were paraded in the march, including Janus himself, envoys from Ottoman Empire, Hafsid dynasty and Sharif of Mecca praised Barsbay for his victory, Janus was then brought to the sultan, humiliated, he was forced to pay a 200,000 dinar ransom and agree to an annual tribute.

References 

Wars involving the Kingdom of Cyprus
Wars involving the Mamluk Sultanate
15th century in the Mamluk Sultanate
1420s conflicts
15th century in Cyprus